John Braithwaite may refer to:

John Braithwaite (engineer) (1797–1870), English engineer who invented the first steam fire engine
John Braithwaite (criminologist) (born 1951), criminologist at the Australian National University
John Braithwaite (sport shooter) (1925–2015), known as Bob Braithwaite, British trap shooter
John Braithwaite (writer) (born 1633), English Quaker
John Braithwaite (author) (1700–1768), English author
John Braithwaite the elder (1760–1818), British engineer
John Braithwaite (soldier) (1885–1916), New Zealand journalist, soldier and convicted mutineer
Sir John Braithwaite, 1st Baronet (1739–1803), Commander-in-Chief of the Madras Army

See also
John Braithwaite Wallis (1877–1961), Canadian entomologist
Braithwaite (surname)